Pasquale La Rocca (born 24 June 1989) is an Italian dancer and choreographer. Best known as former Italian Ballroom and Latin Champion, La Rocca joined the second series of the Belgian version of Dancing with the Stars.

Early life 
La Rocca was born in Naples, Italy. He has been dancing since the age of nine.

Amateur dancing career 
La Rocca began his amateur dancing career in 2003 partnered with fellow Italian dancer, Concetta Picascia. Their best result was finish top three in the Italian National 10 Dance Championships.

Between 2005 and 2006, La Rocca partnered Vincenza Napolitano. Together they earned first places in TeamMatch della Danza in San Bendetto and MasterDanzOpen in Pescara.

Between late 2006 and late 2007, La Rocca partnered Marika Fondi. Together they earned many first places, most notably at TeamMatch della Danza at the 2006 San Benedetto Open and Supercoppa in Foligno the following year.

Throughout 2008, La Rocca partnered Veronica D'asti. They had a short but successful partnership, achieving many top five finishes most notably at the 2008 Verona Open.

La Rocca's final amateur partner was Kristina Pfeiffer. Between 2012 and 2013 they had a successful run, winning the Amateur Latin Trophy at the Clapson Dodd Competition Day in 2012.

Professional dancing career 
La Rocca joined in 2014 the Broadway production of Burn the Floor touring in London’s West End and around the world including China, Australia and Japan. During the South African leg of the tour, La Rocca was named as Dance Captain of the company. La Rocca remained with the touring company until 2018.

In 2017, La Rocca joined former Strictly Come Dancing professional dancer, Flavia Cacace, on her 'Tango Moderno' tour.

In 2018, La Rocca appeared as a back-up dancer on Strictly Come Dancing's annual Blackpool special.

In 2019, La Rocca joined Strictly Come Dancing professional dancers, Dianne Buswell, Amy Dowden and Chloe Hewitt on their 'Here Come the Girls' tour.

Dancing with the Stars

Belgium
In September 2019, La Rocca joined the cast of the second series of the second incarnation (seventh overall) of the Belgian version of Dancing with the Stars. He was partnered with influencer, Julie Vermeire. On 10 November 2019, Vermeire and La Rocca won the series.

Performances with Julie Vermeire

Ireland
On 12 November 2019, just two days after he won the Belgian version, it was confirmed that La Rocca would be joining the cast of the fourth series of the Irish version of the show as a professional dancer. He partnered radio broadcaster, Lottie Ryan. Due to the COVID-19 pandemic the series was cut short by one week. On 15 March 2020, Ryan and La Rocca won the series. During the fifth series of the show, La Rocca partnered former jockey, Nina Carberry. On 27 March 2022, Carberry and La Rocca won the series, making this his second consecutive win on the show and third of the worldwide franchise. On 24 November 2022, due to scheduling conflicts resulting from his participation in the Italian series, La Rocca announced that he was not returning for the sixth series in 2023.

Highest and Lowest Scoring Per Dance

1 This score was awarded during Switch-Up Week.

Performances with Lottie Ryan

Performances with Nina Carberry

Italy
On 3 September 2022, La Rocca announced via Instagram that he would be joining the Italian version of the show, Ballando con le Stelle for its seventeenth season as a professional dancer. He partnered journalist, Luisella Costamagna. In the second week of the competition Costamagna suffered an injury to her knee, this negatively effected the couple's performances forcing her to sit and move very little throughout most of them. This caused controversy, with many viewers questioning whether or not Costamagna and La Rocca should have remained in the competition when Costamagna was not physically able to dance. Judge, Selvaggia Lucarelli was particularly vocal with her opinions stating that she felt the couple should have bowed out gracefully and scored them 'zero' three weeks in a row. At the beginning of the sixth live show, Costamagna and La Rocca announced their decision to withdraw from the competition as Costamagna's injury had not healed sufficiently enough to continue. They were the third couple to leave the competition. Costamagna and La Rocca returned in the tenth week of the season to compete in the 'Repechage' - which saw five couples who had the competition return to dance again to win back a place in the following week's grand finale. Costamagna and La Rocca won the public vote and were, therefore, made finalists. On 23 December 2022, Costamagna and La Rocca were voted winners of the series, giving La Rocca his fourth consecutive win in a row - continuing his undefeated streak.

Performances with Luisella Costamagna

References 

1989 births
Living people
Italian ballroom dancers
People from Naples